Rosy Thomas  (1927-2009) was an Indian writer of Malayalam literature.

Biography
She was born in 1927 in Kerala. She was the daughter of Mary Paul and literary critic M. P. Paul. She married Malayalam playwright and literary critic C. J. Thomas, but was widowed at the age of 31. Her best known work is a memoir on her husband C. J. Thomas, Ivan Ente Priya C. J. She died on 6 December 2009 .

Selected works
Ivan ente priya C. J. (Biography)
Urangunna Simham (Memoir on M. P. Paul)
Annie (Novel)
Jalakakkazhcha (Essays)
Malavellam
Amerikkayil oru malayalippennu (Travelogue)

Translations
Boccaccio 
Animal Farm
So Many Hungers

References

Malayalam-language writers
Women writers from Kerala
1927 births
2009 deaths
Indian memoirists
Indian women essayists
Indian women non-fiction writers
Women biographers
20th-century Indian biographers
Indian women novelists
20th-century Indian novelists
Indian women travel writers
Indian travel writers
Novelists from Kerala
20th-century Indian essayists
20th-century Indian women writers
Indian women memoirists
20th-century memoirists